Georgetown Little Theatre is a THEA Award-winning community theatre group based in Georgetown, Ontario. Formed in 1960, it is one of the oldest continuously existing community theaters in Canada. 

Their first performance was Bill Johnson's Dirty Work at the Crossroads on February 24, 1961. The theatre group has performed regularly at the John Elliott Theatre since the building's 1981 opening.

References

External links

Community theatre
Theatre companies in Ontario
Arts organizations established in 1960
1960 establishments in Ontario